The  are a professional baseball team in the Shikoku Island League Plus of Japan. Established in 2005, the Mandarin Pirates mainly play their home games at Botchan Stadium in Matsuyama, the capital city of Ehime Prefecture. 

They won the 2015 and 2016 season titles by beating other teams in the Island League playoff.

External links
Ehime Mandarin Pirates (in Japanese) 

Baseball teams in Japan
Baseball teams established in 2005
Sports teams in Ehime Prefecture
2005 establishments in Japan